"Sen Bir Tanesin" is the ninth single by Hepsi. However it is the group's first song to differ from their previous released as this is the first Pop rock song to be released by the group.

History
The song was recorded for the Turkish version of the Winx Club Movie soundtrack. It was the first time the group had recorded a song in the genre of rock and wasn't the typical R&B/Pop song the group are used to. "Sen Bir Tanesin" was recorded with another song for the soundtrack called "Sadece bir kiz", however this song is more typical of the group as it is a ballad.

Music video
The music video sees the girls in rocky clothes performing at a car garage. Scenes of the Winx Club Movie cut in between the performance. This is the second music video not to contain any choreographed dancing by the girls.

References

External links
 Grup Hepsi 

2008 singles
Hepsi songs
Turkish songs
2007 songs
Song articles with missing songwriters